Harvey J. Scott was a longtime Pittsburgh Police leader, who served as Pittsburgh Police Chief from Spring 1939 – August 11, 1952.

See also

 Police chief
 Allegheny County Sheriff
 List of law enforcement agencies in Pennsylvania

External links

Chiefs of the Pittsburgh Bureau of Police
Year of birth missing
Year of death missing